The Bangladesh National Film Award for Lifetime Achievement is one of the most prestigious film awards given in Bangladesh. Since 2009, awards have been given in the category.

List of winners

References

Sources

 
 
 
 
 
 

Awards established in 2009
Lifetime Achievement